Anolis demissus, the Île Grande Cayemite green anole, is a species of lizard in the family Dactyloidae. The species is found on Île Grande Cayemite in Haiti.

References

Anoles
Reptiles described in 1969
Endemic fauna of Haiti
Reptiles of Haiti
Taxa named by Albert Schwartz (zoologist)